A latifundium (Latin: latus, "spacious" and fundus, "farm, estate") is a very extensive parcel of privately owned land. The latifundia of Roman history were great landed estates specializing in agriculture destined for export: grain, olive oil, or wine. They were characteristic of Magna Graecia and Sicily, Egypt, Northwest Africa and Hispania Baetica. The latifundia were the closest approximation to industrialized agriculture in Antiquity, and their economics depended upon slavery.

During the modern colonial period, the European monarchies often rewarded services with extensive land grants in their empires. The forced recruitment of local labourers allowed by colonial law made these land grants particularly lucrative for their owners. These grants, fazendas (in Portuguese) or haciendas (in Spanish), were also borrowed as loanwords, Portuguese latifúndios and Spanish latifundios or simply fundos.

Agrarian reforms aimed at ending the dominance of the latifundia system are still a popular goal of several national governments around the world.

Ancient Rome

The basis of the latifundia in Spain and Sicily was the ager publicus that fell to the dispensation of the state through Rome's policy of war in the 1st century BC and the 1st century AD. As much as a third of the arable land of a new province was taken for agri publici and then divided up with at least the fiction of a competitive auction for lease holdings rather than outright ownership. Later in the Empire, as leases were inherited, ownership of the former common lands became established by tradition, and the leases became taxable.

The first latifundia were accumulated from the spoils of war, confiscated from conquered peoples beginning in the early 2nd century BC. The prototypical latifundia were the Roman estates in Magna Graecia (the south of Italy) and in Sicily, which distressed Pliny the Elder (died AD 79) as he travelled, seeing only slaves working the land, not the sturdy Roman farmers who had been the backbone of the Republic's army. Latifundia expanded with conquest, to the Roman provinces of Mauretania (modern Maghreb) and in Hispania Baetica (modern Andalusia).

Large villa rustica holdings in Campania, around Rome, in Cisalpine Gaul (the modern Po Valley) and in  Gallia Narbonensis were the base for a self-sufficient economy, similar to the haciendas of Latin America. They produced oil, wine or garum for export. The practice of establishing agricultural coloniae as a way to compensate Roman soldiers created smaller landholdings, which would then be acquired by large landowners in times of economic distress. Thus the direction, over time, was towards the consolidation of landholdings into larger units.

Latifundia could be devoted to livestock (sheep and cattle) or to the cultivation of olive oil, grain, and wine. However, in Italy, they did not produce grain. Rome had to import grain (in the Republican period, from Sicily and North Africa; in the Imperial era, from Egypt). Ownership of land, organized in the latifundia, defined the Roman Senatorial class. It was the only acceptable source of wealth for senators, though Romans of the elite class would set up their freedmen as merchant traders, and participate as silent partners in businesses from which senatores were disqualified.

The latifundia quickly started economic consolidation as larger estates achieved greater economies of scale and senators did not pay land taxes. Owners re-invested their profits by purchasing smaller neighbouring farms, since smaller farms had lower productivity and could not compete, in an ancient precursor of agribusiness. By the 2nd century AD, latifundia had replaced many small and medium-sized farms in some areas of the Roman Empire. As small farms were bought up by the wealthy with their vast supply of slaves, the newly landless peasantry moved to the city of Rome, where they became dependent on state subsidies. Overall, the latifundia increased productivity. Free peasants did not completely disappear: many became tenants on estates that were worked in two ways: partly directly controlled by the owner and worked by slaves and partly leased to tenants. It was one of the greatest levels of worker productivity before the 19th century. Such consolidation was not universally approved of, as it consolidated more and more land into fewer and fewer hands, mainly Senators and the Roman emperor. Efforts to reverse the trend by agrarian laws were generally unsuccessful. Pliny the Elder argued that the latifundia had ruined Italy and would ruin the Roman provinces as well. He reported that at one point just six owners possessed half of the province of Africa, which may be a piece of rhetorical exaggeration as the North African cities were filled with flourishing landowners who filled the town councils.

Pliny the Elder was very much against the profit-oriented estates described in the writings of Columella. His writings can be seen as a part of the 'conservative' reaction to the profit-oriented new attitudes of the upper classes of the Early Empire (Martin 1971
).

Ancient Greece
The landscape of the Greek mainland does not lend itself to large estates. Olive oil and wine for trade were typically produced by many small groves and vineyards, concentrated in fewer hands at the presses and shipping ports. The grasslands of Thessaly and Macedon were pasture for grazing horses. Meat was not a staple in Mediterranean diets.

During the Hellenistic period, latifundia were typical of the export-oriented agriculture of coastal Syria and the Ptolemaic Kingdom in Egypt.

Europe
In the collapse of the Western Roman Empire, the largely self-sufficient villa-system of the latifundia remained among the few political-cultural centres of a fragmented Europe. These latifundia had been of great importance economically, until the long-distance shipping of wine and oil, grain and garum disintegrated, but extensive lands controlled in a single pair of hands still constituted power: it can be argued that the latifundia formed part of the economic basis of the European social, however there is no evidence of this. The gift of a villa, or of a series of them, owned by a powerful patron was at the basis of all the great monasteries and abbeys founded in Western Europe until the time of Charlemagne, when the land-gifts, significantly, tended to be of forest instead.

Italy
In the 6th century, Cassiodorus was able to apply his own latifundia to support his short-lived Vivarium in the heel of Italy. Shortly thereafter, Monte Cassino was founded in a former Imperial villa. 

In Sicily, latifundia dominated the island from medieval times. They were abolished by sweeping land reform mandating smaller farms in 1950–1962, funded from the Cassa per il Mezzogiorno, the Italian government's development fund for southern Italy (1950–1984).

Spain
In the Iberian Peninsula, the Castilian Reconquista of Muslim territories provided the Christian kingdom with sudden extensions of land, which the kings ceded as rewards to nobility, mercenaries and military orders to exploit as latifundia, which had been first established as the commercial olive oil and grain latifundia of Roman Hispania Baetica. The gifts finished the traditional small private ownership of land, eliminating a social class that had also been typical of the al-Andalus period.

In the Iberian peninsula, the possessions of the Church did not pass to private ownership until the ecclesiastical confiscations of Mendizábal, the "secularization" of church-owned latifundia, which proceeded in pulses through the 19th century.

Big areas of Andalusia are still populated by an underclass of jornaleros, landless peasants who are hired by the latifundists as "day workers" for specific seasonal campaigns. The jornalero class has been fertile ground for socialism and anarchism. Still today, among the main Andalusian trade unions is the Rural Workers Union (Sindicato Obrero del Campo), a far-left group famous for their squatting campaigns in the town of Marinaleda, Province of Seville.

Polish–Lithuanian Commonwealth
Following the Union of Lublin in 1569, large expanses of land in Ukraine came under the control of the Polish Crown, which allowed for their exploitation by the Polish nobility. Over the course of the 17th century, these lands came to be mainly concentrated in vast estates, now commonly referred to as latifundia, which were owned by a small number of magnate families which came to be the dominant political and social group in the commonwealth. These estates were diminished following the Cossack uprisings of the 17th century and largely disappeared following Russia's annexation of the Lithuanian lands of the Polish–Lithuanian Commonwealth at the close of the 18th century.

German Ostsiedlung
In the course of Ostsiedlung in the Germania Slavica, large plots of land were acquired by Germanic settlers giving rise to a landed gentry class called junker in what became known as East Elbia. After World War II, ethnic Germans were expulsed from areas east of the Oder Neisse line and a land reform in the German Democratic Republic removed the junker as a class by the collectivizing of agriculture.

See also

Roman agriculture
Latifundio–minifundio land tenure structure
Pronoia
Agro-town
Plantation
Sánchez Navarro latifundio, Mexico
Encomienda
Encomiendas in Peru

Notes

References
Stephen L. Dyson, The Roman Countryside (Duckworth Debates in Archaeology)
René Martin: Recherches sur les agronomes latins et leurs conceptions économiques et sociales, Paris, 1971.
 John Paul Russo, "The Sicilian Latifundia," Italian Americana, March 1999, Vol. 17 Issue 1, pp 40–57

External links
Kautsky, Karl (1908) "The Technological Inferiority of the Slave Economy" from I. The Slave Economy, Book Two: Society In The Roman Empire, Foundations of Christianity. Published in English: Russell and Russell, 1953.
Dr Frithjof Kuhnen, (University of Göttingen), "Latifundia (Hacienda)"
Jonathan Conning (Hunter College), "Latifundia economics"  Hunter College Department of Economics Working Papers with number 02/1.

Economy of ancient Rome
Roman villa
Land tenure
Country estates